The white-mantled tamarin, Leontocebus weddelli melanoleucus,  is a subspecies of Weddell's saddle-back tamarin, a tamarin monkey from South America. It is found in Brazil, between Rio Jurua and Rio Tarauacá.

References

white-mantled tamarin
Mammals of Brazil
Endemic fauna of Brazil
Subspecies
white-mantled tamarin
Taxa named by Alípio de Miranda-Ribeiro